Patas railway station is a small railway station in Pune district, Maharashtra. Its code is PAA. It serves Patas village. The station consists of three platforms.

References 

Railway stations in Pune district
Pune railway division